In Ancient Greek philosophy, an arche is a first principle from which other principles are derived. The concept of an arche was adapted from the earliest cosmogonies of Hesiod and Orphism, through the physical theories of Pre-Socratic philosophy and Plato before being formalized as a part of metaphysics by Aristotle.

Etymology 
Arche sometimes also transcribed as arkhé) is an Ancient Greek word with primary senses "beginning", "origin" or "source of action": from the beginning, οr the original argument,  and later "first principle" or "element". By extension, it may mean  "first place", "method of government", "empire, realm", "authorities" "command". The first principle or element corresponds to the "ultimate underlying substance" and "ultimate indemonstrable principle".

Mythical cosmogonies
The heritage of Greek mythology already embodied the desire to articulate reality as a whole and this universalizing impulse was fundamental for the first projects of speculative theorizing. It appears that the order of "being" was first imaginatively visualized before it was abstractly thought.

In the mythological cosmogonies of the Near East, the universe is formless and empty and the only existing thing prior to creation was the water abyss. In the Babylonian creation story, Enuma Elish, the primordial world is described as a "watery chaos" from which everything else appeared. This watery chaos has similarities in the cosmogony of the Greek mythographer Pherecydes of Syros. In the mythical Greek cosmogony of Hesiod (8th to 7th century BC), the origin of the world is Chaos, considered as a divine primordial condition, from which everything else appeared. In the creation "chaos" is a gaping-void, but later the word is used to describe the space between the earth and the sky, after their separation. "Chaos" may mean infinite space, or a formless matter which can be differentiated. The notion of temporal infinity was familiar to the Greek mind from remote antiquity in the religious conception of immortality. The conception of the "divine" as an origin influenced the first Greek philosophers. In the Orphic cosmogony, the unaging Chronos produced Aether and Chaos and made in divine Aether a silvery egg, from which everything else appeared.

Ionian school 
The earliest Pre-Socratic philosophers, the Ionian material monists, sought to explain all of nature (physis) in terms of one unifying arche. This is considered as a permanent substance or either one or more which is conserved in the generation of rest of it. From this all things first come to be and into this they are resolved in a final state. This source of entity is always preserved.

Thales of Miletus (7th to 6th century BC), the father of philosophy, claimed that the first principle of all things is water, and considered it as a substance that contains in it motion and change. His theory was supported by the observation of moisture throughout the world and coincided with his theory that the earth floated on water. His ideas were influenced by the Near-Eastern mythological cosmogony and probably by the Homeric statement that the surrounding Oceanus (ocean) is the source of all springs and rivers.

Anaximander argued that water could not be the arche, because it could not give rise to its opposite, fire. Anaximander claimed that none of the elements (earth, fire, air, water) could be arche for the same reason. Instead, he proposed the existence of the apeiron, an indefinite substance from which all things are born and to which all things will return. Apeiron (endless or boundless) is something completely indefinite; and, Anaximander was probably influenced by the original chaos of Hesiod (yawning abyss). 

Anaximander was the first philosopher that used arche for that which writers from Aristotle onwards called "the substratum" (Simplicius Phys. 150, 22). He probably intended it to mean primarily "indefinite in kind" but assumed it also to be "of unlimited extent and duration". The notion of temporal infinity was familiar to the Greek mind from remote antiquity in the religious conception of immortality and Anaximander's description was in terms appropriate to this conception. This arche is called "eternal and ageless". (Hippolitus I,6,I;DK B2)

Anaximenes, Anaximander's pupil, advanced yet another theory. He returns to the elemental theory, but this time posits air, rather than water, as the arche and ascribes to it divine attributes. He was the first recorded philosopher who provided a theory of change and supported it with observation. Using two contrary processes of rarefaction and condensation (thinning or thickening), he explains how air is part of a series of changes. Rarefied air becomes fire, condensed it becomes first wind, then cloud, water, earth, and stone in order. The arche is technically what underlies all of reality/appearances.

Aristotle 
For Aristotle, the arche is the condition necessary for the existence of something, the basis for what he calls "first philosophy" or metaphysics.

References

Concepts in ancient Greek metaphysics